Out of the Drifts is a lost 1916 silent film romance produced by the Famous Players Film Company and distributed by Paramount Pictures. It was directed by J. Searle Dawley and starred Marguerite Clark.

Cast
Marguerite Clark - Elise
J. W. Johnston - Rudolph
Albert Gran - Father Benedict
William Courtleigh Jr. - George Van Rensselaer
Ivan F. Simpson - Martin
DeWitt Lillibridge - Reggie Featherstone
Kitty Brown - Cleo
Florence Johns - Trixie
Robert Conville - Heinrich

References

External links
 
AllMovie.com

1916 films
American silent feature films
Films directed by J. Searle Dawley
Lost American films
1910s romance films
American black-and-white films
American romance films
1910s American films